The 2019 NCAA Division I men's soccer tournament was the 61st edition of the NCAA Division I men's soccer tournament, a postseason tournament to determine the national champion of NCAA Division I men's college soccer. The first four rounds of the competition were held at the home ground of the higher seed, while the College Cup (semifinals and final) were held at WakeMed Soccer Park in Cary, North Carolina. The championship match took place December 15, 2019.

Qualification 

As in previous editions of the NCAA Division I Tournament, the tournament features 48 participants out of a possible field of 203 teams. Of the 48 berths, 24 are allocated to the 21 conference tournament champions and to the regular season winners of the Ivy League, Pac-12 Conference, and West Coast Conference, which do not have tournaments. The remaining 24 berths are supposed to be determined through an at-large process based upon the Ratings Percentage Index (RPI) of teams that did not automatically qualify.

The NCAA Selection Committee also names the top sixteen seeds for the tournament, with those teams receiving an automatic bye into the second round of the tournament. The remaining 32 teams play in a single-elimination match in the first round of the tournament for the right to play a seeded team in the second round.

Qualified teams

Seeded teams

Schedule

Bracket

Regional 1 
Host Institution*

Regional 2 

Host Institution*

Regional 3 

Host Institution*

Regional 4 

Host Institution*

2019 College Cup

Results

First round

Second round

Third round

Quarterfinals

Semifinals

Final

Statistics

Goalscorers 
4 Goals

 Joe Bell — Virginia

3 Goals

 Will Baynham — UC Santa Barbara
 Victor Bezerra — Indiana
 Daryl Dike — Virginia
 Derek Dodson — Georgetown
 Kyle Holcomb — Wake Forest
 Bruno Lapa — Wake Forest
 Rodney Michael — UC Santa Barbara
 Jacob Montes — Georgetown
 Robbie Robinson — Clemson
 Paul Rothrock — Georgetown

2 Goals

 Ethan Bartlow — Washington
 Tanner Beason — Stanford
 Blake Bodily — Washington
 Gabriel Costa — SMU
 Trevor Davock — Providence
 Josh DiMatteo — West Virginia
 Pedro Fonseca — Louisville
 Cal Jennings — UCF
 Izaiah Jennings — Louisville
 Camron Lennon — Virginia Tech
 David Loera — NC State
 Foster McCune — Georgetown
 Tiago Mendonca — Providence
 Dylan Nealis — Georgetown
 Ryan Raposo — Syracuse
 Jamil Roberts — Marshall
 Rodrigo Robles Grajera — West Virginia
 Kristo Strickler — Virginia Tech
 Jaret Townsend — Washington
 Andreas Ueland — Virginia
 Esben Wolf — Providence

1 Goal

 Luther Archimède — Syracuse
 Grayson Barber — Clemson
 Zion Beaton — Wright State
 Jack Beer — Georgetown
 Matthew Bentley — Missouri State
 Noah Billingsley — UC Santa Barbara
 Eythor Bjorgolfsson — Kentucky
 Henrik Bredeli — SMU 
 Derick Broche — Michigan
 Luke Brown — Maryland
 Aadne Bruseth — Missouri State
 Thibault Candia — UC Santa Barbara
 Machop Chol — Wake Forest
 Deri Corfe — Wright State
 Nathaniel Crofts — Virginia
 Cherif Dieye — Louisville
 Bissafi Dotte — Campbell
 Massimo Ferrin — Syracuse
 Justin Gielen — Maryland
 Christian Gómez — California
 Jacob Gould — New Hampshire
 Axel Gunnarsson — Virginia
 Joshua Harrison — Mercer
 Patrick Hogan — Charlotte
 Keegan Hughes — Stanford
 Alex Hummel — Wright State
 Thibaut Jacquel — Campbell
 Luke Johnson — Charlotte
 Alistair Johnston — Wake Forest
 Malcolm Johnston — Maryland
 Bilal Kamal — New Hampshire
 James Kasak — Virginia Tech
 Edward Kizza — Pittsburgh
 Brandon Knapp — St. John's
 Noam Kolakofsky — Rhode Island
 Kristofer Konradsson — Boston College
 Harrison Kurtz — Seattle
 Matt Lock — Campbell
 Lewis Long IV — James Madison
 Logan Lucas — West Virginia 
 Jack Lynn — Notre Dame
 Eric Matzelevich — Maryland
 Kyle May — Penn State
 Garrett McLaughlin — SMU
 Noe Meza — Seattle
 Gio Miglietti — Washington
 Andrew Mitchell — Loyola Chicago
 Aaron Molloy — Penn State
 Tyrone Mondi — Coastal Carolina
 Josue Monge — South Florida
 Eddie Munjoma — SMU
 Andres Muriel Albino — West Virginia
 Rhys Myers — Butler
 Connor Noblat — Seattle
 Jessie Ortiz — Seattle
 Spencer Patton — Virginia
 Chance Pellerin — Charlotte
 Preston Popp — Charlotte
 John Rea — Notre Dame
 Jason Reyes — Kentucky
 Emile Rzepecki — Coastal Carolina
 Bradley Sample — Louisville
 Mohamed Seye — Clemson
 Stefan Sigurdarson — Boston College
 Skage Simonsen — St. John's
 Kasper Skraep — Coastal Carolina
 Yoni Sorokin — UCF
 Daniel Steedman — Virginia
 Mike Suski — Boston College
 Filippo Tamburini — Rhode Island
 Derek Waldeck — Stanford
 Bryce Washington — Pittsburgh
 Duhaney Williams — Loyola Marymount
 Daniel Wu — Georgetown
 Milo Yosef — Marshall
 Sean Zawadzki — Georgetown

Own goals 
1 Own Goal

 Nyk Sessock — Pittsburgh (playing against Georgetown)

Record by Conference 

 The R32, S16, E8, F4, CG, and NC columns indicate how many teams from each conference were in the Round of 32 (second round), Round of 16 (third round), quarterfinals, semi-finals, Final, and National Champion, respectively.

See also 
 2019 NCAA Division I Women's Soccer Tournament
 2019 NCAA Division I men's soccer season

References

External links 

 NCAA Division I Men's College Cup

Tournament
NCAA Division I Men's Soccer Tournament seasons
|NCAA Division I men's soccer tournament
NCAA Division I men's soccer tournament
NCAA Division I men's soccer tournament